The Girls' 52 kg competition at the 2018 Summer Youth Olympics was held on 8 October, at the Asia Pavilion.

Schedule
All times are in local time (UTC-3).

Results
Legend

1st number — Ippon
2nd number — Waza-ari
s — Shido

Main Bracket

Repechage

Final standings

References

 Draw

External links
 

G52
Judo at the Youth Olympics Girls' 52 kg
Youth G52